Michael Boatwright (born September 12, 1995) is an American murderer who was convicted for robbing and murdering rapper and singer-songwriter Jahseh Onfroy, commonly known as XXXTentacion, in Deerfield Beach, Florida on June 18, 2018. After robbing XXXTentacion, Boatwright shot him six times without provocation and left him to die in his car. 

Boatwright was arrested on July 10, 2018 in connection with the murder. Boatwright had been arrested multiple times prior. He was tried with two of his co-defendants in February to March 2023. On March 20, 2023, the jury found him guilty of premeditated first-degree murder and robbery with a firearm. He is currently awaiting sentencing, but faces a presumptive sentence of life in prison without the possibility of parole.

Earlier crimes 
Boatwright had been arrested multiple times prior to the murder of XXXTentacion, mainly on drug charges. In 2013, he was arrested in Broward County for assault or battery on specified officials or employees. The same year, he was arrested again for selling cocaine or heroin within 1,000 feet of a school zone. For these charges, he was put on community control.

In 2015, Boatwright was arrested again for possession of cannabis and PVP, which also counted as a violation of his community control. Boatwright had already been in jail for an arrest on unrelated drug charges before he was charged with the murder of Jahseh Onfroy.

Murder of XXXTentacion 

On June 18, 2018, Boatwright had been in a rented car with his fellow co-conspirators: Trayvon Newsome, Dedrick Williams, and Robert Allen. The four were driving around, looking for someone to rob, and Williams recognized Jahseh Onfroy,  XXXTentacion, and the four tracked and targeted him. The four eventually trapped Onfroy in his own car with their rental car, and Boatwright and Newsome robbed Onfroy, stealing Onfroy's gold chain and his Louis Vuitton bag containing $50,000. Boatwright then walked one or two feet back, looked Onfroy in the eyes, and shot him six times, murdering him.

Trial 

Michael Boatwright went to trial with two of his co-defendants: Trayvon Newsome and Dedrick Williams on February 7, 2023, nearing five years after the murder. His third co-defendant, Robert Allen had previously taken a plea deal for second-degree murder for his testimony against Boatwright, Newsome, and Williams. Boatwright's attorney claimed in his opening that the fact that Boatwright searched "accessory to murder" proved he was innocent, but this was later disproven by Allen, who said that Boatwright searched it because he misinformed Allen that Allen could only be charged with accessory rather than actual murder. A DNA analyst testified that Boatwright's DNA on the mask used in the murder was rarer than one in 929 nonillion.

On March 20, 2023, the eighth day of jury deliberations, Boatwright and his two other co-defendants were found guilty on all counts. He now awaits sentencing and faces a presumptive sentence of life in prison without the possibility of parole.

Notes

References

1995 births
Living people
2018 murders in the United States
21st-century American criminals
American assassins
American male criminals
American people convicted of murder
Criminals from Florida
Deaths by firearm in Florida
People from Broward County, Florida
People convicted of murder by Florida
Violence against men in the United States
XXXTentacion